Prof Kenneth Hurlstone Jackson CBE FRSE FSA DLitt (1 November 1909 – 20 February 1991) was an English linguist and a translator who specialised in the Celtic languages. He demonstrated how the text of the Ulster Cycle of tales, written circa AD 1100, preserves an oral tradition originating some six centuries earlier and reflects Celtic Irish society of the third and fourth century AD. His Celtic Miscellany is a popular standard.

In retirement, Jackson continued his work on place-names and Goidelic languages. However he suffered a stroke in 1984 that restricted his work.

An obituary was published in The Times on 8 March 1991 and in the journal Nomina.

Early life
Born at Beddington, Surrey, England, he was the son of Alan Stuart Jackson and his wife, Lucy Hurlstone.

His early education was at Hillcrest School, Wallington (1916–19), and then at Whitgift School in Croydon, from 1920 to 1928. He won an open scholarship to St John's College, Cambridge in 1928. He studied under Hector and Nora Chadwick, becoming fluent in six Celtic languages. At Cambridge he read Classics and then studied the early cultures of Ireland and Britain. He was then awarded a travelling scholarship during which he undertook study and fieldwork in Wales and Ireland. In the 1950s he spent his vacations recording dialects for the Linguistic Survey of Scotland.

Academic appointments
Jackson returned to Cambridge in 1934 as a lecturer in Celtic. In 1939 he went to Harvard University and was appointed an associate professor in 1940, being the first chair of the Department of Celtic Language and Literature. He undertook war service with the Uncommon Languages section of British censorship (where he said he learned Japanese in three weeks). Afterwards he went back to Harvard, and became a full professor in 1948. He accepted the chair of Celtic Languages, History and Antiquities at the University of Edinburgh, Scotland (1950–1979).

Publications 
While at Edinburgh Jackson published articles and books on the ancient Celts, and the Dark Ages and Middle Ages, on all six modern Celtic languages, on folklore, placenames and dialects. A bibliography of his publications appears in Studia Celtica 14/14, pp 5–11 (1979–80). His writings are always insightful and stimulating, often the only sources in English for their subject, and even where the reader may wish to disagree with his conclusions, the weight of his erudition and mastery of the early Celtic material must be taken into account. It is scarcely possible to come across a publication or longer article on Celtic studies that does not refer to Professor Jackson's work. There is also the advantage for those not familiar with the Celtic languages that much of his work is in an English-language medium, although this can make an appreciation of Celtica rather unbalanced, as an understanding of sources in at least Welsh can help develop a larger picture, where different opinions are represented.

List of publications

 1935. Studies in Early Celtic Nature Poetry, Cambridge: University Press.
 1935. Early Welsh Gnomic Poems, Cardiff, University of Wales Press.
1951, see below 1971
 1953. Language and History in Early Britain: a chronological survey of the Brittonic languages, first to twelfth century A.D., Edinburgh: University of Edinburgh Press.
 1955. "The Pictish Language" in F. T. Wainwright (ed.) The Problem of the Picts. Edinburgh.
 1955. Contributions to the Study of Manx Phonology, University of Edinburgh Linguistic Survey of Scotland Series.
 1959. "The Arthur of History" Arthurian Literature in the Middle Ages, Oxford: Clarendon Press. .
 1959. "Arthur in Early Welsh Verse" Arthurian Literature in the Middle Ages, Oxford: Clarendon Press.
 1961. "The international popular tale and early Welsh tradition" The Gregynog Lectures, 1961, Cardiff: University of Wales Press.
 1964. The Oldest Irish Tradition: a window on the Iron Age, Cambridge: University Press. Reprinted 1999.
 1967. A Historical Phonology of Breton, Dublin: Dublin Institute for Advanced Studies 
 1969. The Gododdin: the Oldest Scottish poem, Edinburgh: University Press.
 1971. A Celtic Miscellany: Translations from the Celtic Literatures; revised ed. (The Penguin Classics; 247.) Harmondsworth: Penguin Books.  (first published by Routledge & Kegan Paul in 1951). Poetry and prose from six Celtic languages, Irlsh, Scottish Gaelic, Manx, Welsh, Cornish and Breton.
 1990. Aislinge Meic Con Glinne, Dublin Institute for Advanced Studies, Dublin,

Other activities

Jackson was a Fellow of the British Academy (elected 1957) and a Commissioner for the ancient and historical monuments of Scotland. He held honorary degrees from universities in England, Wales, Ireland and Brittany. He was appointed a CBE in 1985 for his work on Celtic studies. He was an Honorary Fellow of the Modern Language Association. He was a member of the Council of the English Placename Society for over forty years, being both vice-president and then President.

He gave the John Rhys Lecture at the British Academy in 1953 on Common Gaelic, and the 1964 Rede Lecture on The Oldest Irish Tradition.

In 1977 he was elected a Fellow of the Royal Society of Edinburgh. His proposers were Douglas Grant, Evelyn Ebsworth, Neil Campbell, Arnold Beevers, and Sir Thomas Malcolm Knox. He retired in 1979.

Family

He married Janet Dall Galloway on 12 August 1936. Their two children, Alastar and Stephanie, were born in the United States but brought up in Scotland.

References

 Dictionary of National Biography, Oxford University Press.
 Studia Celtica 14–15, pp 1–11 (1979–80).
 The English Placename Society Journal, Volume 23 pp 49–50 (1991).
 Studia Celtica 26–27, 202–212 (1991–92).
 Proceedings of the British Academy 80, pp 319–32 (1993 for 1991).
 Nomina 15, pp 127–29, 1991–2.

1909 births
1991 deaths
Harvard University faculty
Alumni of St John's College, Cambridge
Arthurian scholars
Celtic studies scholars
Commanders of the Order of the British Empire
Linguists from England
Historical linguists
Oghamologists
Linguists of Pictish
People from Croydon
Phonologists
Corresponding Fellows of the Medieval Academy of America
People educated at Whitgift School
Fellows of the Royal Society of Edinburgh